Daxlanden is a borough of Karlsruhe, Baden-Württemberg, in the southwest of Germany. 
This former fishing village lies west of the city centre of Karlsruhe, not far from the river Rhine on the river Alb and comprises about 11,500 inhabitants.

History 
Daxlanden was first mentioned in 1261 as "villa daslar" in a papal document. However, the place is certainly older, as indicated by existence of the Weißenburg Monastery and Gottesaue Monastery.

In 1396, the Appen Mill in Daxlanden was first mentioned upon its donation to the hospital in Baden (today Baden-Baden).The Appen Mill remained property of the hospital until into the 18th century and was the official mill of the surrounding boroughs Bulach, Beiertheim, Daxlanden, Mühlburg and Knielingen.

In 1407, Archbishop to Cologne Friedrich III. von Saarwerden settled a dispute over hunting rights in the  "Daheslarerau" and surrounding areas between Rupert, King of Germany, and Bernard I, Margrave of Baden-Baden in favour of the former.

In 1463, Daxlanden established its own parish, previously it belonged to the parish of Forchheim. With the division of the Margraviate of Baden, Daxlanden was designated to Baden-Baden and belonged therewith to the Ettlingen Council. The boom years Gold panning in the gold fields in Daxlanden were in 1579. From the 18th century on they have been fruitless.

On the 6th of March 1651 the worst catastrophe in the history of Daxlanden occurred. A break in the dam on the Rhein destroyed 700 acres of fields, 20 houses and the local church. As a consequence of this, half of Daxlanden was at risk of dropping into the Rhein. Following many such flooding catastrophes afflicting the borough, a new Daxlanden was established on a high bank further from the Rhein.

In 1665, the Appen Mill that had been destroyed in the Thirty Years War was rebuilt.

1673/77 saw new dams for the Rhein being constructed around Daxlanden and Rappenwörth. It had been attempted many times to restrain the Rhein through dam building.

External links 
 Daxlanden in the City Wiki
 Die Appenmühle, einst Getreidemühle heute Energieerzeuger
 Stadtteilchronik Daxlanden
 Geschichte von Daxlanden

References

Karlsruhe
Boroughs of Karlsruhe